Bartow White (November 7, 1776 in Yorktown, New York, Westchester County, New York – December 12, 1862 in Fishkill, Dutchess County, New York) was an American physician and politician from New York.

Life
He was the son of Dr. Ebenezer White (1746–1826) and Helena (Bartow) White. He attended the common schools and completed preparatory studies. Then he studied medicine with his father, and with Dr. Seaman in New York City, and commenced practice in Fishkill in 1799. In May 1804, he married Ann Schenck (1783–1861), and they had nine daughters and three sons.

White was elected to the 19th United States Congress, holding office from March 4, 1825, to March 3, 1827. Afterwards he resumed the practice of medicine. He was a presidential elector on the Whig ticket in 1840 voting for William Henry Harrison. In 1845, the Board of Regents of the University of the State of New York conferred an honorary degree of M.D. on White.

He suffered from epilepsy during the last 15 years of his life. He was buried in the Dutch Reformed Church Cemetery in Fishkill.

External links

Around Fishkill published by the Fishkill Historical Society (page 12)
Transactions of the Medical Society of the State of New York (1863; pages 393f)

1776 births
1862 deaths
People from Yorktown, New York
New York (state) Whigs
19th-century American politicians
1840 United States presidential electors
People from Fishkill, New York
Physicians from New York (state)
National Republican Party members of the United States House of Representatives from New York (state)